Fate Gear (stylized as FATE GEAR) is a Japanese female heavy metal band from Tokyo, formed in 2015 by guitarist Mina.

History
Five months after leaving Destrose due to ongoing health issues, guitarist Mina announced the formation of Fate Gear with vocalist Nico in July 2015. Joined by guest bassist Sakae and guest drummer Hiro, the band made its live debut on August 1, 2015, at Meguro Rock-May-Kan. Their debut album, A Light in the Black, was released on August 12 and includes a re-recorded Destrose song.

In May 2016, Kurumi Fujioka from the band Mysterious Priestess joined Fate Gear as keyboardist. However, Hiro had her last performance with the band on May 28.

They released their second album Oz -Rebellion- on June 21, 2017, via their own record label, Steam Steel Records. Its opening track was arranged by former Terra Rosa keyboardist Masashi Okagaki.

Fate Gear's third album 7 Years Ago was released on April 11, 2018, and includes Mina's past project Arch Roses's song "Fenixx 2011". It also features several guest vocalists and musicians.

The EP Headless Goddess was released on January 9, 2019, and is composed almost entirely of re-recorded Destrose songs. Once again, Fate Gear collaborated with several guest vocalists on the EP.

The collaborations continued with their January 13, 2021, album, The Sky Prison. The EP Scars in my Life -English Edition- followed just days later on January 27.

Line-up
Current
  – guitar (2015–present)
 Nana – vocals (2018–present)
 Erika – bass (2016–2021, 2022–present)
 Haruka – drums (2016–present)
 Yuri – keyboards (2017–present)

Former
 Nico – vocals (2015–2018)
  – bass (2015–2016)
 Nino – bass (2021–2022)
 Hiro – drums (2015–2016)
 Lumina – keyboards (2015–2016)
 Kurumi – keyboards (2016–2017)
 Yuri – keyboards (2017–2022)

Timeline

Guest Musicians
Fate Gear has worked with various guest musicians over the years for their album releases and Live performances.

Current

NANA (THEO NOVA, tour member of FATE GEAR overseas concerts) – vocals

IBUKI (ex.Disqualia) – vocals

Maki Oyama (solo singer, AcoMetal) – vocals

Past

Manami (Innocent Material, Dragon Eyes) – vocals

Ibara (Emille's Moonlight Serenade) – vocals

RAMI (ex.Aldious) – vocals

Maiko (Jade Forest Company, My complex of Academy) – vocals

Jill (Unlucky Morpheus) – violin

Yashiro (Headless Goddess music video) – guitar

Maki (DraiN) – bass

Discography

 Studio albums

 EPs

 Video albums

References

External links 

Japanese heavy metal musical groups
All-female bands
Musical groups established in 2015
2015 establishments in Japan
Musical groups from Tokyo
Musical quintets